Tom Helmore (4 January 1904 – 12 September 1995) was an English film actor. He appeared in more than 50 films between 1927 and 1972, including three directed by Alfred Hitchcock.

Helmore was born in London, England and died in Longboat Key, Florida, USA. Helmore worked in his father's accounting firm while working as an extra in films. He subsequently pursued acting as a career, working predominantly on the stage, and later on Broadway, which led to Helmore's Hollywood career.

In British and American films, Helmore was mostly employed as a dapper, comedic actor, even if he is best known for his role as the villain Gavin Elster in Vertigo.

Partial filmography

The Ring (1927) - Spectator (uncredited)
Young Woodley (1928) - Milner
White Cargo (1930) - Worthing
Leave It to Me (1930) - Tony
The House of Unrest (1931) - David
The Wife's Family (1931) - Willie Nagg
The House Opposite (1932) - Minor role (uncredited)
The Barton Mystery (1932) - Harry Maitland
Above Rubies (1932) - Paul
The King's Cup (1933) - Ronnie Helmore
Up for the Derby (1933) - Ronnie Gordon
Song at Eventide (1934) - Michael Law
Virginia's Husband (1934) - Barney Hammond
The Feathered Serpent (1934) - Peter Dewin
The Riverside Murder (1935) - Alfred Jerome
The Right Age to Marry (1935) - Stephen
Secret Agent (1936) - Col. Anderson (uncredited)
Luck of the Turf (1936) - Lord Broadwater
Treachery on the High Seas (1936) - Edward Brailstone
Merry Comes to Town (1937) - Peter Bell
Easy Riches (1938) - Harry Miller
Paid in Error (1938) - Jimmy Randle
Shadowed Eyes (1940) - Ian
Three Daring Daughters (1948) - Michael Pemberton
Scene of the Crime (1949) - Norrie Lorfield
Malaya (1949) - Matisson
Shadow on the Wall (1950) - Crane Weymouth
Trouble Along the Way (1953) - Harold McCormick
Let's Do It Again (1953) - Courtney Craig
The Shadow (1954, TV pilot) - Lamont Cranston / The Shadow
Lucy Gallant (1955) - Jim Wardman
The Tender Trap (1955) - Mr. Loughran
This Could Be the Night (1957) - Stowe Devlin
Designing Woman (1957) - Zachary Wilde
Vertigo (1958) - Gavin Elster
Count Your Blessings (1959) - Hugh Palgrave
The Man in the Net (1959) - Gordon Moreland
The Time Machine (1960) - Anthony Bridewell
Advise & Consent (1962) - British Ambassador
Flipper's New Adventure (1964) - Sir Halsey Hopewell

References

External links

1904 births
1995 deaths
Donaldson Award winners
English male film actors
English male silent film actors
Male actors from London
20th-century English male actors
People from Longboat Key, Florida
English emigrants to the United States